Xanthesma is a genus of Australian bees in the family Colletidae. The genus was first described in 1965 by Charles Duncan Michener.

Species
The following list is of 48 valid names given at both IRMNG and at AFD.
Xanthesma argosomata 
Xanthesma baringa 
Xanthesma blanda 
Xanthesma brachycera 
Xanthesma chrysea 
Xanthesma clara 
Xanthesma clethrosema 
Xanthesma clypearis 
Xanthesma dasycephala 
Xanthesma deloschema 
Xanthesma eremica 
Xanthesma euxesta 
Xanthesma evansi 
Xanthesma fasciata 
Xanthesma federalis 
Xanthesma flava 
Xanthesma flavicauda 
Xanthesma foveolata 
Xanthesma furcifera 
Xanthesma hirsutoscapa 
Xanthesma infuscata 
Xanthesma isae 
Xanthesma lasiosomata 
Xanthesma levis 
Xanthesma lucida 
Xanthesma lukinsiana 
Xanthesma lutea 
Xanthesma maculata 
Xanthesma megacephala 
Xanthesma megastigma 
Xanthesma melanoclypearis 
Xanthesma merredensis 
Xanthesma micheneri 
Xanthesma newmanensis 
Xanthesma nigrior 
Xanthesma nukarnensis 
Xanthesma parva 
Xanthesma perpulchra 
Xanthesma primaria 
Xanthesma robusta 
Xanthesma scutellaris 
Xanthesma sigaloessa 
Xanthesma stagei 
Xanthesma striolata 
Xanthesma trisulca 
Xanthesma tuberculata 
Xanthesma villosula 
Xanthesma vittata

References

Further reading

External links

Colletidae
Bee genera
Hymenoptera of Australia
Taxa described in 1965
Taxa named by Charles Duncan Michener